(born 3 August 1975) is a Japanese former swimmer who competed in the 1992 Summer Olympics.

References

1975 births
Living people
Japanese female backstroke swimmers
Olympic swimmers of Japan
Swimmers at the 1992 Summer Olympics